FFmpeg is a free and open-source software project consisting of a suite of libraries and programs for handling video, audio, and other multimedia files and streams. At its core is the command-line ffmpeg tool itself, designed for processing of video and audio files. It is widely used for format transcoding, basic editing (trimming and concatenation), video scaling, video post-production effects and standards compliance (SMPTE, ITU).

FFmpeg also includes other tools: ffplay, a simple media player and ffprobe, a command-line tool to display media information. Among included libraries are libavcodec, an audio/video codec library used by many commercial and free software products, libavformat (Lavf), an audio/video container mux and demux library, and libavfilter, a library for enhancing and editing filters through a Gstreamer-like filtergraph.

FFmpeg is part of the workflow of many other software projects, and its libraries are a core part of software media players such as VLC, and has been included in core processing for YouTube and Bilibili. Encoders and decoders for many audio and video file formats are included, making it highly useful for the transcoding of common and uncommon media files.

FFmpeg is published under the LGPL-2.1-or-later or GPL-2.0-or-later, depending on which options are enabled.

History 
The project was started by Fabrice Bellard (using the pseudonym "Gérard Lantau") in 2000, and was led by Michael Niedermayer from 2004 until 2015. Some FFmpeg developers were also part of the MPlayer project. 

The name of the project is inspired by the MPEG video standards group, together with "FF" for "fast forward". The logo uses a zigzag pattern that shows how MPEG video codecs handle entropy encoding.

On March 13, 2011, a group of FFmpeg developers decided to fork the project under the name Libav. The event was related to an issue in project management, in which developers disagreed with the leadership of FFmpeg.

On January 10, 2014, two Google employees announced that over 1000 bugs had been fixed in FFmpeg during the previous two years by means of fuzz testing.

In January 2018, the ffserver command-line program – a long-time component of FFmpeg – was removed. The developers had previously deprecated the program citing high maintenance efforts due to its use of internal application programming interfaces.

The project publishes a new release every three months on average. While release versions are available from the website for download, FFmpeg developers recommend that users compile the software from source using the latest build from their source code Git version control system.

Codec history 
Two video coding formats with corresponding codecs and one container format have been created within the FFmpeg project so far. The two video codecs are the lossless FFV1, and the lossless and lossy Snow codec. Development of Snow has stalled, while its bit-stream format has not been finalized yet, making it experimental since 2011. The multimedia container format called NUT is no longer being actively developed, but still maintained.

In summer 2010, FFmpeg developers Fiona Glaser, Ronald Bultje, and David Conrad, announced the ffvp8 decoder. Through testing, they determined that ffvp8 was faster than Google's own libvpx decoder. Starting with version 0.6, FFmpeg also supported WebM and VP8.

In October 2013, a native VP9 decoder and OpenHEVC, an open source High Efficiency Video Coding (HEVC) decoder, were added to FFmpeg. In 2016 the native AAC encoder was considered stable, removing support for the two external AAC encoders from VisualOn and FAAC. FFmpeg 3.0 (nicknamed "Einstein") retained build support for the Fraunhofer FDK AAC encoder. Since version 3.4 "Cantor" FFmpeg supported the FITS image format. Since November 2018 in version 4.1 "al-Khwarizmi" AV1 can be muxed in MP4 and Matroska incl. WebM.

Components

Command line tools 
 ffmpeg is a command-line tool that converts audio or video formats. It can also capture and encode in real-time from various hardware and software sources such as a TV capture card.
 ffplay is a simple media player utilizing SDL and the FFmpeg libraries.
 ffprobe is a command-line tool to display media information (text, CSV, XML, JSON), see also Mediainfo.

Libraries 
 libswresample is a library containing audio resampling routines.
 libavresample is a library containing audio resampling routines from the Libav project, similar to libswresample from ffmpeg.
 libavcodec is a library containing all of the native FFmpeg audio/video encoders and decoders. Most codecs were developed from scratch to ensure best performance and high code reusability.
 libavformat (Lavf) is a library containing demuxers and muxers for audio/video container formats.
 libavutil is a helper library containing routines common to different parts of FFmpeg. This library includes hash functions, ciphers, LZO decompressor and Base64 encoder/decoder.
 libpostproc is a library containing older H.263 based video postprocessing routines.
 libswscale is a library containing video image scaling and colorspace/pixelformat conversion routines.
 libavfilter is the substitute for vhook which allows the video/audio to be modified or examined between the decoder and the encoder. Filters have been ported from many projects including MPlayer and avisynth.
 libavdevice is a library containing audio/video io through internal and external devices.

Supported hardware

CPUs 
FFmpeg encompasses software implementations of video and audio compressing and decompressing algorithms. These can be compiled and run on diverse instruction sets.

Many widespread instruction sets are supported by FFmpeg, including x86 (IA-32 and x86-64), PPC (PowerPC), ARM, DEC Alpha, SPARC, and MIPS.

Special purpose hardware 
There are a variety of application-specific integrated circuits (ASICs) for audio/video compression and decompression. These ASICs can partially or completely offload the computation from the host CPU. Instead of a complete implementation of an algorithm, only the API is required to use such an ASIC.

Use with the FFmpeg utility 
Internal hardware acceleration decoding is enabled through the -hwaccel option. It starts decoding normally, but if a decodable stream is detected in hardware, then the decoder designates all significant processing to that hardware, thus accelerating the decoding process. Whereas if no decodable streams are detected (as happens on an unsupported codec or profile), hardware acceleration will be skipped and it will still be decoded in software. -hwaccel_device option is applied when the hardware requires a particular device to function especially when there are several graphic cards available.

Supported codecs and formats

Image formats 
FFmpeg supports many common and some uncommon image formats.

The  PGMYUV image format is a homebrewn variant of the binary (P5) PGM Netpbm format. FFmpeg also supports 16-bit depths of the PGM and PPM formats, and the binary (P7) PAM format with or without alpha channel, depth 8 bit or 16 bit for pix_fmts monob, gray, gray16be, rgb24, rgb48be, ya8, rgba, rgb64be.

Supported formats 

In addition to FFV1 and Snow formats, which were created and developed from within FFmpeg, the project also supports the following formats:

The data can be passed through without being processed through -c copy. One use is cutting video footage without requiring the time and processing of re-encoding.

Muxers 
Output formats (container formats and other ways of creating output streams) in FFmpeg are called "muxers". FFmpeg supports, among others, the following:

 AIFF
 ASF
 AVI and also input from AviSynth
 BFI
 CAF
 FLV
 GIF
 GXF, General eXchange Format, SMPTE 360M
 HLS, HTTP Live Streaming
 IFF
 ISO base media file format (including QuickTime, 3GP and MP4)
 Matroska (including WebM)
 Maxis XA
 MPEG-DASH
 MPEG program stream
 MPEG transport stream (including AVCHD)
 MXF, Material eXchange Format, SMPTE 377M
 MSN Webcam stream
 NUT
 Ogg
 OMA
 RL2
 Segment, for creating segmented video streams
 Smooth Streaming
 TXD
 WTV

Pixel formats 

FFmpeg supports many pixel formats. Some of these formats are only supported as input formats. The command ffmpeg -pix_fmts provides a list of supported pixel formats.

FFmpeg does not support IMC1-IMC4, AI44, CYMK, RGBE, Log RGB and other formats. It also does not yet support ARGB 1:5:5:5, 2:10:10:10, or other BMP bitfield formats that are not commonly used.

Supported protocols

Open standards 

IETF RFCs:
FTP
Gopher
HLS
HTTP
HTTPS
RTP
RTSP
SCTP
SDP
SRTP
TCP
TLS
UDP
UDP-Lite
 IETF I-Ds:
SFTP (via libssh)
 Microsoft OSP:
CIFS/SMB (via libsmbclient) 
MMS over TCP (MS-MMSP)  
MMS over HTTP (MS-WMSP)
 CENELEC
 SAT>IP
 OASIS standards:
 AMQP 0-9-1 (via librabbitmq)
 SRT Alliance standard:
 SRT (via libsrt)

De facto standards 

 RTSP over TLS
 Icecast protocol
 Adobe RTMP, RTMPT, RTMPE, RTMPTE and RTMPS 
 RealMedia RTSP/RDT
 ZeroMQ (via libzmq)
 RIST (librist)

Supported filters 

FFmpeg supports, among others, the following filters.

Audio 

 Resampling (aresample)
 Pass/Stop filters
 Low-pass filter (lowpass)
 High-pass filter (highpass)
 All-pass filter (allpass)
 Butterworth Band-pass filter (bandpass)
 Butterworth Band-stop filter (bandreject)
 Arbitrary Finite Impulse Response Filter (afir)
 Arbitrary Infinite Impulse Response Filter (aiir)
 Equalizer
 Peak Equalizer (equalizer)
 Butterworth/Chebyshev Type I/Type II Multiband Equalizer (anequalizer)
 Low Shelving filter (bass)
 High Shelving filter (treble)
 Xbox 360 rqulizer
 FIR equalizer (firequalizer)
 Biquad filter (biquad)
 Remove/Add DC offset (dcshift)
 Expression evaluation
 Time domain expression evaluation (aeval)
 Frequency domain expression evaluation (afftfilt)
 Dynamics
 Limiter (alimiter)
 Compressor (acompressor)
 Dynamic range expander
 Side-chain Compressor (sidechaincompress)
 Compander (compand)
 Noise gate (agate)
 Side-chain Noise gate(sidechaingate)
 Distortion
 Bitcrusher (acrusher)
 Emphasis (aemphasis)
 Amplify/Normalizer
 Volume (volume)
 Dynamic Audio Normalizer (dynaudnorm)
 EBU R 128 loudness normalizer (loudnorm)
 Modulation
 Sinusoidal Amplitude Modulation (tremolo)
 Sinusoidal Phase Modulation (vibrato)
 Phaser (aphaser)
 Chorus (chorus)
 Flanger (flanger)
 Pulsator (apulsator)
 Echo/Reverb
 Echo (aecho)
 Routing/Panning
 Stereo widening (stereowiden)
 Increase channel differences (extrastereo)
 M/S to L/R (stereotools)
 Channel mapping (channelmap)
 Channel splitting (channelsplit)
 Channel panning (pan)
 Channel merging (amerge)
 Channel joining (join)
 for Headphones
 Stereo to Binaural (earwax, ported from SoX)
 Bauer Stereo to Binaural (bs2b, via libbs2b)
 Crossfeed (crossfeed)
 Multi-channel to Binaural (sofalizer, requires libnetcdf)
 Delay
 Delay (adelay)
 Delay by distance (compensationdelay)
 Fade
 Fader (afade)
 Crossfader (acrossfade)
 Audio time stretching and pitch scaling
 Time stretching (atempo)
 Time-stretching and Pitch-shifting (rubberband, via librubberband)
 Editing
 Trim (atrim)
 Silence-padding (apad)
 Silence remover (silenceremove)
 Show frame/channel information
 Show frame information (ashowinfo)
 Show channel information (astats)
 Show silence ranges (silencedetect)
 Show audio volumes (volumedetect)
 ReplayGain scanner (replaygain)
 Modify frame/channel information
 Set output format (aformat)
 Set number of sample (asetnsamples)
 Set sampling rate (asetrate)
 Mixer (amix)
 Synchronization (asyncts)
 HDCD data decoder (hdcd)
 Plugins
 LADSPA (ladspa)
 LV2 (lv2)
 Do nothing

Video 

 Transformations
 Cropping (crop, cropdetect)
 Fading (fade)
 Scaling (scale)
 Padding (pad)
 Rotation (rotate)
 Transposition (transpose)
 Others:
 Lens correction (lenscorrection)
 OpenCV filtering (ocv)
 Perspective correction (perspective)
 Temporal editing
 Framerate (fps, framerate)
 Looping (loop)
 Trimming (trim)
 Deinterlacing (bwdif, idet, kerndeint, nnedi, yadif, w3fdif)
 Inverse Telecine
 Filtering
 Blurring (boxblur, gblur, avgblur, sab, smartblur)
 Convolution filters
 Convolution (convolution)
 Edge detection (edgedetect)
 Sobel Filter (sobel)
 Prewitt Filter (prewitt)
 Unsharp masking (unsharp)
 Denoising (atadenoise, bitplanenoise, dctdnoiz, owdenoise, removegrain)
 Logo removal (delogo, removelogo)
 Subtitles (ASS, subtitles)
 Alpha channel editing (alphaextract, alphamerge)
 Keying (chromakey, colorkey, lumakey)
 Frame detection
 Black frame detection (blackdetect, blackframe)
 Thumbnail selection (thumbnail)
 Frame Blending (blend, tblend, overlay)
 Video stabilization (vidstabdetect, vidstabtransform)
 Color and Level adjustments
 Balance and levels (colorbalance, colorlevels)
 Channel mixing (colorchannelmixer)
 Color space (colorspace)
 Parametric adjustments (curves, eq)
 Histograms and visualization
 CIE Scope (ciescope)
 Vectorscope (vectorscope)
 Waveform monitor (waveform)
 Color histogram (histogram)
 Drawing
 OCR
 Quality measures
 SSIM (ssim)
 PSNR (psnr)
 Lookup Tables
 lut, lutrgb, lutyuv, lut2, lut3d, haldclut

Supported test patterns 
 SMPTE color bars (smptebars and smptehdbars)
 EBU color bars (pal75bars and pal100bars)

Supported LUT formats 
 cineSpace LUT format
 Iridas Cube
 Adobe After Effects 3dl
 DaVinci Resolve dat
 Pandora m3d

Supported media and interfaces 
FFmpeg supports the following devices via external libraries.

Media 
 Compact disc (via libcdio; input only)

Physical interfaces 
 IEEE 1394 (a.k.a. FireWire; via libdc1394 and libraw1394; input only)
 IEC 61883 (via libiec61883; input only)
 DeckLink
 Brooktree video capture chip (via bktr driver; input only)

Audio IO 
 Advanced Linux Sound Architecture (ALSA)
 Open Sound System (OSS)
 PulseAudio
 JACK Audio Connection Kit (JACK; input only)
 OpenAL (input only)
 sndio
 Core Audio (for macOS)
 AVFoundation (input only)
 AudioToolbox (output only)

Video IO 
 Video4Linux2
 Video for Windows (input only)
 Windows DirectShow
 Android Camera (input only)

Screen capture and output 
 Simple DirectMedia Layer 2 (output only)
 OpenGL (output only)
 Linux framebuffer (fbdev)
 Graphics Device Interface (GDI; input only)
 X Window System (X11; via XCB; input only)
 X video extension (XV; via Xlib; output only)
 Kernel Mode Setting (via libdrm; input only)

Others 
 ASCII art (via libcaca; output only)

Applications

Legal aspects 
FFmpeg contains more than 100 codecs, most of which use compression techniques of one kind or another. Many such compression techniques may be subject to legal claims relating to software patents. Such claims may be enforceable in countries like the United States which have implemented software patents, but are considered unenforceable or void in member countries of the European Union, for example. Patents for many older codecs, including AC3 and all MPEG-1 and MPEG-2 codecs, have expired.

FFmpeg is licensed under the LGPL license, but if a particular build of FFmpeg is linked against any GPL libraries (notably x264), then the entire binary is licensed under the GPL.

Projects using FFmpeg 

FFmpeg is used by software such as Blender, Cinelerra-GG Infinity, HandBrake, Kodi, MPC-HC, Plex, Shotcut, VirtualDub2 (a VirtualDub fork), VLC media player, xine and YouTube. It handles video and audio playback in Google Chrome and the Linux version of Firefox. GUI front-ends for FFmpeg have been developed, including Multimedia Xpert and XMedia Recode.

FFmpeg is used by ffdshow, FFmpegInterop, the GStreamer FFmpeg plug-in, LAV Filters and OpenMAX IL to expand the encoding and decoding capabilities of their respective multimedia platforms.

As part of NASA's Mars 2020 mission, FFmpeg is used by the Perseverance rover on Mars for image and video compression before footage is sent to Earth.

See also 

 MEncoder, a similar project
 List of open-source codecs
 List of video editing software

References

External links 
 

 
Assembly language software
Command-line software
C (programming language) libraries
Cross-platform free software
Free codecs
Free computer libraries
Free music software
Free software programmed in C
Free video conversion software
Multimedia frameworks
Software that uses FFmpeg
Software using the LGPL license